"Feels Like That" is a song recorded by Canadian country duo the Reklaws. The track was co-written by duo member Stuart Walker with Travis Wood, Donovan Woods, and the track's producer Todd Clark. The song was released on a seven-track EP of the same name, and became the third single off the Reklaws' debut album Freshman Year.

Commercial performance
"Feels Like That" was certified Gold by Music Canada on October 2, 2019, with over 40,000 sales. It reached a peak of #1 on the Billboard Canada Country chart dated January 26, 2019, marking their first chart-topper.

Music video
The official music video for "Feels Like That" premiered on January 31, 2019 and was directed by Ben Knechtel. It was shot in Banff, Alberta and Malibu, California, entirely using an iPhone XS camera.

Track listings
Radio single
 "Feels Like That" – 3:31

CD - EP

Charts

Certifications

Release history

References

2018 songs
2018 singles
The Reklaws songs
2018 EPs
Universal Music Canada albums
Universal Music Canada singles
Songs written by Todd Clark 
Songs written by Stuart Walker (singer)
Songs written by Travis Wood (songwriter)
Songs written by Donovan Woods (musician)
Song recordings produced by Todd Clark